WBSQ-LP (105.9 FM) was a radio station licensed to St. Louis, Michigan, United States.  The station was owned by Breckenridge Community Services.

WBSQ-LP's license expired effective October 1, 2012, as the licensee did not file a renewal application. The station's license was cancelled by the Federal Communications Commission on October 5, 2012.

References

External links
 
List of cancelled LPFM stations in Michigan

BSQ-LP
BSQ-LP
Radio stations established in 2003
Defunct radio stations in the United States
Radio stations disestablished in 2012
Defunct community radio stations in the United States
2003 establishments in Michigan
2012 disestablishments in Michigan
BSQ-LP